Founded by entrepreneurs Richard Wrigley and Robert D'Addona, the Manhattan Brewing Company was one of the earliest brewpub concept on the East Coast of the US. The first working brewery in New York City for decades, operations started as a large on-premises multi-tap brewpub in 1984. It was located in a former Consolidated Edison substation on the corner of  Thompson Street and Broome/Watts in SoHo. The international style ales and beers combined with beer cellar style tables and copper kettles were popular with New Yorkers; distribution was then expanded, via draft horses and antique dray, into the New York marketplace with medal winning brands Manhattan Amber and Manhattan Gold Lager. The business struggled however, with a large overhead, the raising of the NY drinking age and the Black Monday crash of October 19, 1987. The doors finally closed in 1991.

Former Manhattan brewmaster Garrett Oliver went on to become brewmaster of the Brooklyn Brewery in 1994.

See also
 List of defunct breweries in the United States

References

External links
New York Beer Nostalgia: the early years of craft beer 
Original article in New York Magazine July 16, 1984
Follow-up: More Manhattan Brewing Company nostalgia 
Beer History: Manhattan Brewing Company, A Lost Craft Beer Pioneer
Postings: SoHo Renovation; What's Brewing? NYTimes Published:April 21, 1991
NEW YORK DAY BY DAY; Burgeoning Brewery NYTimes Published: May 14, 1986
BEER SCHOOL  BOTTLING SUCCESS AT THE BROOKLYN BREWERY see p 10 & 30
How craft brewing grew on either side of the country 
Upscale beer segment bucking the trend.

Companies based in New York City
Defunct brewery companies of the United States